is the eleventh single by Bump of Chicken, released on November 23, 2005. The title tracks are from the album Orbital Period. "Karma" was used as the opening theme for video game and animated series Tales of the Abyss.

Track listing
All tracks written by Fujiwara Motoo.
"supernova"

 (Hidden Track)

Personnel
Fujiwara Motoo — Guitar, vocals
Masukawa Hiroaki — Guitar
Naoi Yoshifumi — Bass
Masu Hideo — Drums

Chart performance

References

External links
Supernova/カルマ on the official Bump of Chicken website.

2005 singles
Bump of Chicken songs
Tales (video game series) music
2005 songs